Rallarsväng is a studio album by Lasse Stefanz, released on 28 May 2008. For the album, the band was awarded a Grammis Award in the "Schlager-dansband of the year" category. On 12 July 2009, the album was awarded a Guldklaven Award in the "Album of the year" category during the Swedish Dansband Week in Malung.

Track listing
Till Österlen
Hemmahamn
En runda i baren (duet with Plura Jonsson)
Innan allt är för sent
Hållplats 31
He'll Have to go
Kalla det drömmar om du vill
När skuggorna faller
Angel Lee
Hem igen
Slöseri med kärlek
Ensam weekend
Mot lugnare vatten
Jag lever för livet
En runda i baren (Danish language-duet with Flemming "Bamse" Jørgensen)

Charts

Certifications

References 

2008 albums
Lasse Stefanz albums